Mahesh is a residential area and historical part of the city of Serampore, in the Indian state of West Bengal.

It is the site of a 14th-century temple of Jagannath, and the Rathayatra of Mahesh, which first took place in 1397, is the second oldest in India.

See also
 Serampore City
 Tin Bazar
 Battala
 Chatra, Serampore
 Dakshin Rajyadharpur
 Sheoraphuli

References

Neighbourhoods in West Bengal
Serampore